Northumberland Park is a place in the Metropolitan Borough of North Tyneside. Although built as an individual settlement along the A19 corridor, it is often referred to as being part of Shiremoor.  There are two main housing estates in Northumberland Park and a Metro station, also named Northumberland Park.

The Northumberland Park estate should not be confused with Northumberland Park on King Edwards Road, North Shields which is a park that opened in 1885.

Economy
There are a number of retail outlets in Northumberland park situated next to the Metro Station. the main outlet is a purpose build Sainsbury's.

Populated places in Tyne and Wear
Metropolitan Borough of North Tyneside